Cho Jae-hyung (born 2 January 1967) is a South Korean figure skater. He competed in the men's singles event at the 1984 Winter Olympics.

References

1967 births
Living people
South Korean male single skaters
Olympic figure skaters of South Korea
Figure skaters at the 1984 Winter Olympics
Place of birth missing (living people)